Varsity Lakes is a suburb in the City of Gold Coast, Queensland, Australia.

The suburb was originally known as Stephens, but in 2002, Stephens, Andrews and a section of Robina were amalgamated to form the new suburb of Varsity Lakes.

Geography

The suburb is bounded to the west by the Pacific Motorway, to the south by Reedy Creek Road, and to the east by Mattocks Road and Bermuda Street.

The Gold Coast railway line enters the suburb from the north-west (Robina) and runs immediately parallel and east of the motorway where the line terminates at Varsity Lakes railway station.

History
In 1873, former Mayor of Brisbane Thomas Blacket Stephens purchased 6980 acres of swampy Gold Coast hinterland and began to drain the swamp to develop dairying naming his first dairy Hill View. His son William Stephens continued the drainage work and established the dairy Merrimac.

In 1981, a southern section of the estate was officially named Stephens in 1981 in honour of Thomas Blacket Stephens.

In 1999, the area between Stephens and Robina was purchased by Delfin Lend Lease and a real estate development known as Varsity Lakes began. Man-made lakes named Lake Orr and Lake Azzura were created and residential development followed.

Varsity College opened on 1January 2001.

In 2002, the suburbs of Stephens, Andrews and a portion of Robina to create a new suburb named Varsity Lakes after the development.

Air Church Gold Coast opened in 2010.

The median age of the Varsity Lakes population was 32 years, 5 years below the national median of 37. 61.1% of people living in Varsity Lakes were born in Australia. The other top responses for country of birth were New Zealand 8.1%, England 4.8%, China 1.8%, South Africa 1.7%, Malaysia 1%.  76.8% of people spoke only English at home; the next most common languages were 2.3% Mandarin, 1.7% Cantonese, 1.1% Japanese, 1% Korean, 0.9% Arabic. Remaining religions make up for less than two percent individually while "no religion" comprised 24.8%.

Arcadia College was a private secondary (7-12) school for boys and girls. In 2015, Arcadia College combined its two campuses at Southport and Palm Beach into a single campus at 1 Bellevue Drive . In 2018, the school had an enrolment of 188 students with 20 teachers (19 full-time equivalent) and 9 non-teaching staff (7 full-time equivalent). In January 2021, the school relocated to 12 Centreline Place, Robina.

Between 2016 and 2017, Varsity Lakes saw an 11 per cent increase in median property sale price.

Education
Varsity College is a government primary and secondary (Prep to 12) school for boys and girls. In 2018, the school had an enrolment of 3,269 students with 243 teachers (223 full-time equivalent) and 107 non-teaching staff (80 full-time equivalent). It includes a special education program. The school has two sites:

 the primary school campus at 1 Bridgewater Drive

 the secondary school campus at 198 Varsity Parade

The suburb is also served by two other primary schools: Caningeraba State School in neighbouring Burleigh Waters to the east and Robina State School in neighbouring Robina to the north-west. It is also served by Miami State High School in neighbouring Miami to the north-east.

Religion

Air Church Gold Coast is at 1/492 Scottsdale Drive. It is affiliated with the Australian Christian Churches.

Varsity Lakes offers several churches for Christianity. These churches include:

 Elevation Church
 Glow Church
 Hope Church Australia
 Metro Church

Retail

Market Square
Market Square offers a range of retail to the Varsity Lakes community. Major chains such as Subway, Night Owl and IGA are all located in Market Square. Market Square also offers banks, beauty salons, bottle shops, chemists, dental care, gyms, real estates, restaurants and taverns.

Christine Corner
Christine Corner is another retail area located in Varsity Lakes which includes a second Subway, a second Night Owl, bakeries, beauty salons, betting agencies, bottle shops, medical centres, newsagents, petrol stations, restaurants, taverns and vets.

Sporting Facilities
Majority of sporting facilities in Varsity Lakes are present in both the primary and secondary school campuses. Frascott Park also offers grass ovals and a basketball ring. Public facilities include:

 Basketball Courts
 Grass Ovals
 Tennis Courts

Sports House
The Varsity Lakes Sports House is a precinct for water sports opened in 2012 and was created by Delphin Lend Lease, Gold Coast City Council and Varsity Lakes Community Limited. The centre is based on Lake Orr and has a heavy emphasis on Rowing but also caters for Canoeing, Kayaking, Sailing and Dragon Boating.

Skate Park
In 2008, the Varsity Lakes Skate Park (officially known as Janette Green Park) underwent a $1 million revamp. On 17 March 2009 skating legend Tony Hawk visited the skate park and commented "We just go wherever the skate parks are and you've got a great skate park here."

Central Park
Central Park offers undercover gym facilities, a grass oval with Australian rules football posts and basketball courts. In December 2017, an undercover outdoor gym was opened at Central Park which includes a basketball court fitted with lights allowing for nighttime use.

Community Centre
The Varsity Lakes Community Centre regularly hosts sporting group activities; including aerobics, fitness, walking and table tennis.

Public transport

Varsity Lakes is serviced by two forms of public transport. Surfside Buslines operate a number of services though the suburb that connect Varsity Lakes to Robina, Broadbeach and Tweed Heads. Queensland Rail operates a City Train line that runs from Central Railway Station, Brisbane though to the Gold Coast, terminating at Varsity Lakes Railway Station. Trains depart the station every half-hour and operate until late, seven days a week. Both Queensland Rail and Surfside Buslines are under contract by Translink who operate an integrated ticketing system throughout South East Queensland.

References

External links

 University of Queensland: Queensland Places: Varsity Lakes

 
Suburbs of the Gold Coast, Queensland